Uche Sherif (born September 3, 1983 in Nigeria) is a Nigerian footballer who is currently played for Sharks F.C.

Trivia
Formerly has played as a defender for F.C. Ashdod, Israel since the 2005/2006 season, he came to F.C. Ashdod from Enyimba International F.C., during that season Sherif was bought by Haim Revivo, who is one of F.C. Ashdod owners. He was transferred at the end of the season to Julius Berger F.C. and in September 2008 from Sunshine Stars F.C. to Sharks F.C.

References

External links

Living people
1983 births
Nigerian footballers
Enyimba F.C. players
F.C. Ashdod players
Bridge F.C. players
Sunshine Stars F.C. players
Sharks F.C. players
Israeli Premier League players
Expatriate footballers in Israel
Nigerian expatriate sportspeople in Israel
Association football midfielders